Vikasnagar Legislative Assembly constituency is one of the seventy electoral Uttarakhand Legislative Assembly constituencies of the Indian state of Uttarakhand. It includes the Vikasnagar area of Dehradun District. Vikasnagar is adjacent to Himachal Pradesh district Sirmour and Paonta. VikasnagarTehri Garhwal (Lok Sabha constituency).

Members of the Legislative Assembly

Election results

2022

See also
 Tehri Garhwal (Lok Sabha constituency)

References

External link
  

Politics of Dehradun
Assembly constituencies of Uttarakhand
2002 establishments in Uttarakhand
Constituencies established in 2002